The European Individual Chess Championship is a chess tournament organised by the European Chess Union. It was established in 2000 and has since then taken place on a yearly basis.
Apart from determining the European champions (open and women's), another objective of this tournament is to determine a number of players who qualify for the FIDE World Cup and the knockout Women's World Championship.

Mode of play 
The event consists of two separate tournaments; an open event, and a women's event. Female players may participate in the open section. Both are a Swiss system tournament, with a varying number of rounds. Historically, the only exception to this was the first Women's Championship tournament in 2000, which was held as a knockout tournament.  In 2002, Judit Polgár narrowly missed out on the bronze medal in the open competition by losing a playoff match against Zurab Azmaiparashvili. In 2011, Polgár won the bronze medal in the open competition at Aix-les-Bains, France.

Apart from the first edition in 2000, where in case of a tie the Buchholz rating was used as a tie-breaker, rapid play playoff matches are used to determine the medal winners as well as the world championship qualifiers.

Controversy 

There have been a number of controversies associated with the tournament:

 At most venues, participants and accompanying persons have been obliged to stay at the "official hotel", appointed by the local organizers. The room rates for participants, however, have been significantly higher than for other hotel guests. This in large part contributed to the founding of the ACP in 2003. Also the standard of the hotels as well as of the food has been a focus of complaints by players and journalists.
 As the European Championships are part of the FIDE World Championship cycle, starting with the 2001 edition, the new, faster FIDE time control was used. This led to many complaints by the participants about increased stress, incessant time trouble and a steep deterioration of the quality of the games.

Results (open)

Due to the COVID-19 pandemic, the 2020 European Championship in Podčetrtek, Slovenia was postponed to 2022.

Results (women)

See also
 1942 European Individual Chess Championship
 EU Individual Open Chess Championship
 European Senior Chess Championship
 European Junior Chess Championship
 European Youth Chess Championship
 European Team Chess Championship

References

External links
For complete tables / results, refer to The Week in Chess website:
 2000: Men's results (1–60 places only) Women's results Women's final match
 2000: Men's complete results Russchess.com
 2001: Men's results Women's results
 2002: Men's results Women's results
 2003: Men's and Women´s results
 2004: Men's results Women's results
 2005: Men's results Women's results
 2006: Men's and Women's results
 2007: Men's results
 2008: Men's and Women's results

Supranational chess championships
Women's chess competitions
Chess in Europe
chess